Harish Patel (born 5 July 1953) is an Indian character actor. He has appeared in a variety of Hindi films, but in recent years has begun to appear in American projects like reimagination of Four Weddings and a Funeral on Hulu. His latest project is the MCU film Eternals. Although mainly associated with the stage, he has appeared in Indian and British films and television shows.

Early life and background
Patel was born in Mumbai, Bombay State (now Maharashtra), India. He began performing at the age of seven, when he played male and female roles in the Hindu epic Ramayana.

Acting career
He made his film debut in Mandi directed by Shyam Benegal in 1983. From 1994 to 2008, Patel worked with the Indian theatre director Satyadev Dubey. In 1995, he joined the Indian National Theatre and appeared in the play Neela Kamra. His repertoire has included classical and modern Indian plays as well as plays by Western writers, e.g., Pinter's The Caretaker, Sartre's No Exit, Camus' Cross Purpose, Ionesco's The Lesson, and Mrozek's Vatzlav.

In the spring of 2007, Patel took the lead role of Eeshwar Dutt in Rafta, Rafta..., a comedy written by Ayub Khan-Din and directed by Nicholas Hytner at the National Theatre in London to critical acclaim and sellout audiences.

His credits include The Buddha of Suburbia, China Gate, Mr India and Run Fatboy Run. In 2009 he appeared in Coronation Street playing the role of Umed, Dev Alahan's uncle. Patel also appeared in Mr Stink, Gangsta Granny, The Boy in the Dress and Billionaire Boy, the television film adaptations of children's books by David Walliams. He plays shopkeeper Raj in all the films, although they are set in different places.

His acting career has taken him all over India, and he has performed in the United Kingdom and abroad, in the United States and Dubai among other countries. Patel is a life member of the Cine & TV Artists Association of India.

He is well known for his catchphrase "gayee bhains paanee mein" (the buffalo entered the water), in the movie Mr. India. Additionally, he garnered international recognition after starring in Marvel Studios'  Eternals as Karun. When interviewed regarding the film, Harish admitted to never watching a Marvel film before or even seeing Angelina Jolie or Salma Hayek films before.

Selected filmography

Film

 Mandi (1983)
 Vivek (1985)
Dacait (1987)
 Mr India (1987)
 Billoo Badshah (1989) – Tikdamdas
 Maine Pyaar Kiya (1989)
 Police Public (1990)
 Thanedaar (1990)
 Pratibandh (1990)
 Shola Aur Shabnam (1992) – Mama
 Panaah (1992) – Lala
 Sarphira (1992) – Police Constable No. 111
 Aankhen (1993)- 
 15 August
 Bedardi (1993)- Baburam
 Andaz (1994) 
 Mohra (1994)
 Andaz Apna Apna (1994)
Mafia (1996 film)
 Kama Sutra: A Tale of Love (1996)
 Rangbaaz (1996 film)
 Ghatak: Lethal (1996)
Udaan (1997 film)
 Gupt: The Hidden Truth (1997)
 Tarazu (1997)
 Ziddi (1997) – Personal Secretary (cameo)
 Loha (1997)
 My Son the Fanatic (British film, 1997)
 Purani Kabar (1998)
 Vinashak – Destroyer (1998)
 Salaakhen (1998) – Panteshswar
 Jab Pyaar Kisise Hota Hai (1998)
 Pyaar To Hona Hi Tha (1998)
 Gunda (1998)
 China Gate (1998 film)
 Dhaai Akshar Prem Ke (2000)
 Krodh (2000)
 Badal (2000) – Dayashankar
 Pyaar Ishq Aur Mohabbat (2001)
 Zubeidaa (2001)
 Kuch Tum Kaho Kuch Hum Kahein (2002)
 Bokshu, the Myth (2002)
 Calcutta Mail (2003)
 Love at Times Square (2003)
 Ek Hindustani (2003)
 Thoda Tum Badlo Thoda Hum (2004)
 Chicken Tikka Masala (2005)
 Pyaar Mein Twist (2005)
 Run Fatboy Run (2007)
 Today's Special (2009)
 Kisse Pyaar Karoon (2009)
 Keith Lemon: The Film (2012)
 All in Good Time (2012)
 Jadoo (2013)
 Lies We Tell (2016)
 Shin Banglasia (2021) – Party Janitor (cameo)
 Eternals (2021) – Karun Patel

Television

 Malgudi Days (season 1 episode 4, 1986) – Mahakanjus (Miser)/The Hoard 
 Yatra (1986)
 Bharat Ek Khoj (1988)
 Wagle Ki Duniya (1989)
 The Buddha of Suburbia (1993)
 Gopaljee (1996)
 The No. 1 Ladies' Detective Agency (2008)
 Coronation Street (2009)
 Baa Bahoo Aur Baby (2010)
 Mr Stink (2012)
 Gangsta Granny (2013)
 The Driver (2014)
 The Boy in the Dress (2014)
 Mapp and Lucia (2014)
 Billionaire Boy (2016)
 Vighnaharta Ganesh 2017
 Four Weddings and a Funeral (2019)

References

External links

1953 births
Living people
20th-century Indian male actors
21st-century Indian male actors
Indian male film actors
Indian male soap opera actors
Indian male television actors
Male actors in Hindi cinema
Male actors from Mumbai